Giannis Fronimidis (born 22 April 1937) is a Greek footballer. He played in one match for the Greece national football team in 1965.

References

External links
 
 

1937 births
Living people
Greek footballers
Greece international footballers
Place of birth missing (living people)
Association football goalkeepers
Footballers from Piraeus
Olympiacos F.C. players
Proodeftiki F.C. players